Rukiga District is a district in Western Uganda. Its capital is Mparo. However, the largest urban center in the district is Muhanga.

Location
Rukiga District is bordered by Ntungamo District to the east, the Republic of Rwanda to the southeast, Kabale District to the southwest, Rubanda District to the northwest and Rukungiri District to the north.

Overview
As of August 2017, Rukiga District is made up of the following sub-counties:
(a) Bukinda (b) Kamwezi (c) Kashambya and (d) Rwamucuucu. Muhanga Town Council completes the list of administrative subdivisions in Rukiga. Prior to 1 July 2017, Rukiga was a county in Kabale District.

The district is predominantly rural, with the majority of inhabitants engaged in agriculture. However, several urban centers exist in the district, including: (i) Mparo (ii) Muhanga (iii) Bukinda (iv) Kamwezi (v) Kangondo (vi) Sindi (vii) Rushebeya (viii) Kashumuuruzi (ix) Kitunga and (x) Kantare.

The town of Mparo, where the district headquarters are located, became a town council on 1 July 2017, the day Rukiga attained district status.

Population
The August 2014 national census and household survey enumerated the population in Rukiga District at 100,726 people.

References

External links
 Rukiga District Homepage

 
Kigezi sub-region
Districts of Uganda
Western Region, Uganda